Roman Pindel (born 18 November 1958) is a Polish Roman Catholic bishop.

Ordained to the priesthood on 22 May 1983, Pindel was named bishop of the Roman Catholic Diocese of Bielsko–Żywiec, Poland on 6 January 2014.

References

1958 births
Living people
People from Oświęcim
21st-century Roman Catholic bishops in Poland